Skippers Seafood & Chowder House is a group of independently owned and operated locations licensed by Harbor Wholesale.  There are currently licensed Skippers restaurants operating in Washington.  Skippers also produces retail sizes and industrial sizes of Skippers clam chowder, tartar sauce, cocktail sauce, and coleslaw dressing. The retail items are sold in grocery stores, convenience stores and over the Internet. There are over 50 Skippers fleet locations operating under limited license agreements with Harbor Wholesale.

History 
Skippers was founded by Herb Rosen in Bellevue, Washington, in 1969, at which time Skippers began serving fried fish, prawns, scallops ,and clams, as well as chowders. Its corporate headquarters was eventually moved to Edmonds, where it stayed for many years until moving to SeaTac shortly before the original  Skippers, Inc. was dissolved in 2007 and the Skippers brand was sold to new ownership.

Skippers experienced rapid growth during the 1970s as new restaurants were opened in several western states and British Columbia, Canada. In 1989, Kansas-based NPC International purchased Skippers, Inc., closing some restaurants.  NPC operated Skippers until 1995, when it was purchased by Meridian Capital and from 1995 through 2002, the Skippers management team introduced a line of grilled entrees, including grilled wild-caught salmon, halibut, and chicken.

In late 2002, Skippers was purchased by a group of Pacific Northwest investors although this venture was short-lived. New logos and new products were introduced in the spring of 2003, and again in 2007. As of 2007, there were Skippers stores operating in Idaho, Montana, Oregon, Utah ,and Washington.

On December 12, 2006, Skippers, Inc., filed Chapter 11 bankruptcy in U.S. Court in Seattle in an organizational restructuring. The restructuring failed, and Skippers, Inc., was liquidated on June 29, 2007. Of the 58 stores remaining after Skippers initially filed for bankruptcy, approximately 14 were sold to various individuals and corporate interests through limited license agreements. When the sales of individual units and closures were finalized, Skippers, Inc., ceased to exist as a corporation.

Starway Restaurants acquired all of the intellectual property of Skippers Seafood & Chowder in late 2007, forming a partnership in 2013 with Harbor Wholesale to create the "Go Fleet" locations. Starway eventually sold the intellectual property to Harbor Wholesale at the beginning of 2022. As of October 2022, there are five conventional Skippers restaurants known as "Ships of the Line," operating in Washington. Skippers also offer a limited number of menu items in "Go Fleet" locations, typically found in convenience stores and supermarkets.

See also

 List of seafood restaurants

References

External links 

Regional restaurant chains in the United States
Fast-food chains of the United States
Companies that filed for Chapter 11 bankruptcy in 2006
Restaurants established in 1969
Seafood restaurants in the United States
1969 establishments in Washington (state)
American companies established in 1969
Economy of the Northwestern United States
2022 mergers and acquisitions